Rocha is the capital city of the Rocha Department in Uruguay.

History
It was founded in 1793 and had acquired the status of "Villa" (town) before the independence of Uruguay. On 7 July 1880 it was made capital of the Department of Rocha by the Act of Ley Nº 1.474, while its status was elevated to "Ciudad" (city) on 10 January 1894 by the Act of Ley Nº 2.252.

In literature
Rocha department features in Carlos María Domínguez's 2004 novel  (The house of paper). The narrator visits the ruins of a house of books, which had been built and then destroyed by an obsessive book collector on the sand spit separating Rocha lagoon from the ocean.

Population
In  Rocha had a population of 25,422.
 
Source: Instituto Nacional de Estadística de Uruguay

Geography
The stream Arroyo Rocha flows along the west limits of the city.

Climate
Rocha has a mild humid subtropical climate (Cfa, according to the Köppen climate classification), with pleasant summers and cool winters. It was oceanic (Cfb) before the current climatic table (1961-1990 period).

Transportation
Rocha is on the main road from Montevideo to the border with Brazil. Buses connect it to Montevideo. The rail station was closed in the 1980s. There is a small local airfield. There are plans to improve the local infrastructure substantially. The major project planned is to build a deep water port in or near La Paloma. There are also plans to build an airport to bring in tourism, for example, Rocha's lagoon has a circular bridge especially for it.

Places of worship
 Parish Church of Our Lady of Remedies (Roman Catholic)
 Parish Church of Our Lady of Fatima (Roman Catholic)

Notable people
 

Alberto Demicheli (1896–1980), Uruguayan political figure
Gonzalo González (born 1993), Uruguayan footballer
Elio Rodríguez (born 1962), former Uruguayan footballer
Renzo Sánchez (born 2004), Uruguayan footballer

References

External links
INE map of Rocha

Populated places in the Rocha Department